Rivière du Petit Carbet is a river of Guadeloupe. The river's source is at La Grande Soufrière. It flows through Guadeloupe National Park, traversing the commune of Trois-Rivières in southern Basse-Terre, before flowing into the Caribbean Sea between Saint-Jacques Point and Taste Point.

References

Rivers of Guadeloupe
Rivers of France